The 2001 Wales rugby union tour of Japan was a series of matches played in June 2001 in Japan by the Wales national rugby union team. With their best players involved in the 2001 British & Irish Lions tour to Australia, the squad featured a blend of youth and experience. Although they won just one of their non-test matches on tour, Wales won both tests against the Japan national team.

Squad

Results 
Scores and results list Wales' points tally first.

Wales v Barbarians

Suntory v Wales

Japan Select XV v Wales

First test: Japan v Wales

Pacific Barbarians v Wales

Second test: Japan v Wales

References

Wales
tour
Wales national rugby union team tours
tour
Rugby union tours of Japan
Wales